Dan Palmer (born August 14, 1978), who is originally from Sheffield, South Yorkshire, England, is an English guitarist and now lives in Whittier, California, United States. He is the lead guitarist of the bands Death By Stereo (since Oct 1999) and Zebrahead (since 2013). He has been using Fernandes guitars for a very long time.

Biography 
He was formerly the guitarist for a hardcore punk band called Eyelid, which was formed in North Hollywood, Los Angeles, California in 1994. He joined the band in 1996  but they broke up in 1999. In the same year, Keith Barney, who was the guitarist of a hardcore punk band, Death by Stereo, left the band, so Dan took over Keith's place as the lead guitarist.

In 2013, a punk rock band Zebrahead offered him to join them as the lead guitarist after Greg Bergdorf left the band and he accepted it. He has been using Fernandes guitars for a long time.

He majored classic guitar at university. And he also publicly mentioned that he is a big fan of Van Halen and those two elements (classic guitar and Van Halen)  affected when working at studio for Walk The Plank. The producer of Walk The Plank, Paul Miner, who was formerly a recording engineer of Eyelid and a bassist of Death By Stereo, has been a friend of Dan's for a very long time since then.

Personal life 
His hobby is growing and grooming his mustache, which has been for more than 6 years. He trims, shampoos and conditions it himself every day, for which he gets up earlier in the morning.

References

Living people
Lead guitarists
American rock guitarists
American male guitarists
American heavy metal guitarists
Death by Stereo members
20th-century American guitarists
1978 births
21st-century American guitarists
20th-century American male musicians
21st-century American male musicians
English emigrants to the United States